Blood Colony is a novel by writer Tananarive Due. It is the third book in Due's African Immortals Series. It is preceded by My Soul to Keep and The Living Blood.

2008 American novels
American horror novels
Novels by Tananarive Due